The 1951–52 Challenge Cup was the 51st staging of rugby league's oldest knockout competition, the Challenge Cup.

First round

First leg

Second leg

Second round

Quarter-finals

Semi-finals

Final
Workington Town beat Featherstone Rovers 18–10 in the final played at Wembley Stadium on Saturday 19 April 1952 in front of a crowd of 72,093. Workington full-back and captain-coach Gus Risman became the oldest player to appear in a Cup final at age 41. Three Australians, Tony Paskins, John Mudge and Bevan Wilson came up with decisive plays to help relative newcomers Workington to victory. It was the club's first Challenge Cup win in their first appearance in the final. Billy Ivison, Workington Town's loose forward, was awarded the Lance Todd Trophy for man-of-the-match.

References

Challenge Cup
Challenge Cup